The Battle of Manzikert or Battle of Malazgirt ( Bytva pri Mantsikerte ;Turkish: Malazgirt Muharebesi) was a battle of the Caucasus Campaign of World War I, which took place over the period July 10–26, 1915. Even though losses were heavy on both sides, the Russians retreated north and the Turks retook Malazgirt then they further advanced towards Karakilise where they were defeated on 5–8 August at the Battle of Kara Killisse.

Background

At the beginning of May the Russians captured Tutak and on 17 May the town of Malazgirt was captured.

Operations
On July 10, 1915, Russian General Oganovski launched an offensive to capture the hills just west of Malazgirt. He believed that the Turkish forces in the area were weak. However, the Turkish forces contained several divisions numbering upwards of 40,000 men. On July 16, the Ottoman Army counter-attacked under Abdul Kerim Pasha. They outnumbered the Russians by a factor of 3-1. Oganovski was forced to retreat back to Malazgirt, and in the process the Turks captured his baggage train. On July 20, the Turks retook Malazgirt and on 27 July also took Muş from the Russians. Due to the poor quality of the Russian communications, Yudenich, who was the Russian commander of the Caucasus front, did not learn that the Russian army was in retreat until July 22.

Aftermath 
The Russian army in Malazgirt was outnumbered 3-1 by the Ottoman army. Realizing that if the Ottomans attacked, his army would be destroyed, Yudenich ordered a retreat. The Russians retreated from Malazgirt, and the entire Van region as well. This left the city of Van open to an Ottoman attack, and the Ottomans captured the city on August 22. However, Malazgirt was re-captured by the Russians after the Ottomans were defeated at the Battle of Kara Killisse. Yudenich quickly regrouped his forces, fired Oganovski, and launched a counter-offensive. Russian casualties were reported to be about 10,000. Malazgirt was recaptured but Yudenich did not have a force large enough to exploit the situation further.

Effects on morale
The morale of the Turkish leadership was lifted by the victory at Malazgirt and Abdulkerim Pasha was encouraged by his success to follow the Russians. However, in the following battle of Karakilise in August the Turks were defeated and this in turn raised Russian morale.

References

Further reading

Conflicts in 1915
Battles of World War I involving the Ottoman Empire
Battles of World War I involving Russia
Battles of the Caucasus Campaign
History of Muş Province
1915 in the Ottoman Empire
Bitlis vilayet
July 1915 events